Andréa Fileccia (born 6 December 1991) is a Belgian footballer who plays as a forward for Perwez.

Career
Fileccia left his Belgian youth club Mons in the summer of 2008 to join the Feyenoord Academy in the Netherlands. After playing for Feyenoord's youth teams for two seasons, he joined Eredivisie club Excelsior on loan. Fileccia made his professional debut for Excelsior on 7 August 2010. He replaced Daan Bovenberg in the 65th minute, but couldn't prevent Excelsior losing the season opening away match against De Graafschap (3–0).

Fileccia joined Maritzburg United on 8 July 2016. He left the club on 20 February 2019.

In March 2021, Fileccia moved to Belgian Second Provincial club Perwez.

Statistics

Statistics accurate as of last match played on 7 August 2010.

References

External links
 Voetbal International: Andréa Fileccia 
 

1991 births
Living people
Belgian footballers
Feyenoord players
Excelsior Rotterdam players
UR La Louvière Centre players
Free State Stars F.C. players
Maritzburg United F.C. players
Eredivisie players
South African Premier Division players
Belgian expatriate footballers
Footballers from Hainaut (province)
Association football forwards
Belgian expatriate sportspeople in the Netherlands
Expatriate footballers in the Netherlands
Expatriate soccer players in South Africa
Francs Borains players
Sportspeople from Mons
Belgian expatriate sportspeople in South Africa